Colin Fleming and Jonathan Marray are the defending champions, but decided not to defend their title.

Seeds

Draw

References
 Main Draw

Amex-Istanbul Challenger - Doubles
2015 Doubles
2015 in Turkish tennis